The Kachar is a Hindu community found in the state of Rajasthan in India. They are also known as Kachera or Shishgar.

Origin
The Kachar get their name from the Hindi word kanch, which means glass, and the Kachar were historically involved in the manufacture of glass bangles. Little is known about the origin the community, other than that the earliest references to the community date from at least the 18th century. They are found throughout Maharashtra, and speak the Dakhani dialect of Urdu.

Present circumstances
The Kachar are still involved in the manufacture and selling of glass bangles. Some Kachar also work as daily wage labourers. Their economic situation is bleak, as there is little profit in bangle making. As one of the smaller Muslim communities in Maharashtra, they have little political influence. Their settlement usually contains a caste council, which deals with issues of community welfare. The Kachar intermarry with some neighbouring Muslim communities such as the Attar, Faqir and Pinjara, although most marriages are within the community. They are entirely Sunni Muslim, although they incorporate a few folk beliefs.

See also
 Pinjara

References

Social groups of Maharashtra
Muslim communities of India
Muslim communities of Maharashtra